Besana is an Italian surname. Notable people with the surname include:

 Fred Besana (born 1954), American football player
 Fred Besana (baseball) (1931–2015), American baseball player

See also
 Besana (disambiguation)

Italian-language surnames